Bo City Council is the municipal government of the city of Bo, Sierra Leone's second largest city. The Council is responsible for the general management of the city. The Bo City Council was reestablished in 2004 by the Sierra Leone Parliament under the Sierra Leone Local Government Act The Bo City Council meet at the Bo City Council Hall on Coronation Field Road in Bo, Sierra Leone.

System
Members of the Bo City Council are directly elected every four years by the residents of Bo and they represent different wards throughout the city. Members of the Bo city Council are known as councillors, except the deputy mayor and the Mayor, in whom local executive power is granted within the city of Bo. The current mayor of Bo is Harold Logie Tucker of the Sierra Leone People's Party who was elected with over 69.07% of the vote in the November 2012 Local Council elections.

All officials appointed by the mayor must be approved by the Bo City Council before taking office. Like the rest of the Southern Part of Sierra Leone, Bo city politics is dominated by the Sierra Leone People's Party (SLPP).

Bo City Council powers include, but not limited to:
Collect local tax 
Responsible for the cleaning the city and trash collection
Control streets and petty trading
Issue of business lincense to shop owners and petty traders
Monitore Motorcycle and bike riders
Maintain discipline in schools

References

Government of Sierra Leone
City Council
City councils